The Triumph 10/20 is a car manufactured from 1923 until 1926 by the Triumph Motor Company. It was the first Triumph automobile and was named the 10/20 for the Royal Automobile Club's taxation class of 10 horsepower rating and its actual output of 20 brake horsepower. The design was principally by Arthur Alderson assisted by Alan Lea and Arthur Sykes who were employed by Lea-Francis, to whom Triumph paid a royalty on every car made. It was powered by a 1,393 cc (1.4L) 4-cylinder side-valve engine designed by Harry Ricardo and fitted with a single updraught Zenith carburettor. The four-speed gearbox was mounted centrally and coupled to the engine by a short drive shaft.

The car was launched as a 2-seat, steel panelled, open tourer with provision for a third passenger in a dickey seat, utilising bodywork supplied by the Regent Carriage Company of London. A sports model with aluminium body panels and long wings soon followed, and then in 1924 a fabric-covered 4-seat Weymann saloon featuring a single door on the driver's side and two doors on the passenger side. It had a  wheelbase, making it the largest (by ) of the "light cars" of its era. It was the first British production car to be fitted with hydraulic brakes, but at first on the rear wheels only. Approximately 2,500 of this model and the parallel 13/35 and 15/50 models were made. The price was £430 to £460, expensive compared to a contemporary Wolseley 10 selling for £250.

Further reading
The Story of Triumph Sports Cars. Graham Robson. Motor Racing Publications. 1972. 
A-Z of cars of the 1920s. Nick Baldwin. Bay View Books. 1994

External links
Pre-1940 Triumph Owners Club
Club Triumph – Triumph's 75th anniversary

10 20
First car made by manufacturer
Cars introduced in 1923